Nitzanei Oz (lit. Buds of Strength) is a moshav in central Israel. Located in the Sharon plain near the Green Line and Tulkarm, it falls under the jurisdiction of Lev HaSharon Regional Council.

History
It was founded in 1951 as a Nahal settlement, before being converted to a civilian moshav in 1958. Due to its proximity to the border with Jordan, it was affected by attacks and infiltrations by Palestinian fedayeen until the Six-Day War in 1967.

References

Moshavim
Nahal settlements
Populated places established in 1951
Populated places in Central District (Israel)
1951 establishments in Israel